was a Japanese actor. Orimoto often worked with Kinji Fukasaku and Sadao Nakajima.

He started his acting career at the Shinkyō theatre company in 1949. His first film appearance was in the 1952 film Yamabiko Gakkō directed by Tadashi Imai. In 2019, he died of old age at the age of 92.  His final film appearance was in the 2018 film blank13.

Filmography

Films

 Yamabiko Gakkō (1952)
 Gakusei Shinjū (1954)
 The Eternal Breasts (1955) as Shigeru Anzai
 Mahiru no ankoku (1956) as  Sugita
 Jun'ai Monogatari (1956) as Detective
 The Rice People (1957) as Fisherman
 Planet Prince (1958) as Colonel Matsuda
 Three Outlaw Samurai (1958) as Kurahashi
 The Human condition Part1 (1959) as Sai
 Gang vs. G-Men (1962) as Yuichi Noguchi
 Assassination (1964) as  Kamo Serizawa
 Revenge (1964)
 Kwaidan (1965) 
 Live Today, Die Tomorrow! (1970) as Owner of rice store
 Tora-san's Forget Me Not (1973) as Kurihara
 Battles Without Honor and Humanity: Final Episode (1974) as Hayakawa Hideo
 Karafuto 1945 Summer Hyosetsu no Mon (1974) as Kanzaki Yuichi
 New Battles Without Honor and Humanity: The Boss's Head (1975) as Izeki Seiiji
 New Battles Without Honor and Humanity: Last Days of the Boss (1976) as Motoyama Takao
 Yakuza Graveyard (1976) as Hatano Takeshi
 The Life of Chikuzan (1977)
 Hokuriku Proxy War (1977) as Yanaka
 New Female Convict Scorpion Special: Block X (1977) as Katō
 Message from Space (1977) as Kido
 The Fall of Ako Castle (1978) as Izeki Tokubei
 Nihon no Fixer (1979) as Tsunoma
 No More Easy Life (1979)
 Sōchō no Kubi (1979) as Tamai Shuzō
 Imperial Navy (1981) as Obayashi
 Willful Murder (1981)
 Station (1981) as Chief
 The Go Masters (1982) 
 The Return of Godzilla (1984) as JSDF Chief of Staff Mōri
 Mishima: A Life in Four Chapters (1985) as General Kanetoshi Mashita
 Hissatsu! III Ura ka Omote ka (1985) as Kanō Heima
 Yuwakusha (1989) 
 Rikyū (1989) as Imai Sōkyū
 Lone Wolf and Cub: Final Conflict (1992) as Ishiguro
 Tsuribaka Nisshi 6 (1993)
 The 8-Tomb Village (1996) as Igawa
 New Battles Without Honor and Humanity (2000) as Mizoguchi Takeo
 Sennen no Koi Story of Genji (2001) as Kakuzen
 Kaidan Shin Mimibukuro: Yūrei Mansion (2005) as Kōan
 Be a Man! Samurai School (2008) as Kurosuki no Kokaku
 Kizumomo (2008) as Yumiya Miki
 Watashi wa Kai ni Naritai (2008) as Matsuda
 Shodo Girls (2010) as Tomoya's grandfather
 Hayabusa: Harukanaru Kikan (2012)
 The Mole Song: Undercover Agent Reiji (2014) as Sakuno Yahei
 0.5 mm (2014) as Shōzō Kataoka
 blank13 (2018)

Television drama
 Daichūshingura (1971) as Nagasawa Tenzen
 Kogarashi Monjirō (1973) (ep.11)
 Nemuri Kyōshirō (1973) (ep.23)
 Hissatsu Shiokiya Kagyō (1975) (ep.8) as Yamazaki Kakunoshin
 Hissatsu Shigotonin (1980) (ep.48) as Tsuchida
 Yokugawa Ieyasu (1983) as Ōkubo Tadayo
 Kawaite sōrō (1984)
 Kinpachi-sensei (1985–87) as Honda / (1999-2000) as Onishi
 Taiyō ni Hoero! (1985) (ep.650) as Lawer Ushijima
 Hissatsu Shigotonin Gekitotsu (1991) (ep.2) as Okubo Hikojiro
 Taiheiki (1991) as Shioya Muneharu
 Hana no Ran (1994) as Zenami
 Hideyoshi (1996) as Sakuma Nobumori
 Saka no Ue no Kumo (2010) as Hasegawa Sokichi
 Yasuragi no Sato (2017) as Kanō Eikichi

References

External links
 

1927 births
2019 deaths
Japanese male film actors
20th-century Japanese male actors
Male actors from Yokohama